The Rock River is a tributary of the Big Sioux River, about  long, in southwestern Minnesota and northwestern Iowa in the United States. Via the Big Sioux and Missouri rivers, it is part of the watershed of the Mississippi River. The river's name comes from a prominent rocky outcrop about 175 feet high (designated "The Rock" on Joseph Nicollet's 1843 map of the area) of reddish-gray Sioux Quartzite, about 3 miles (5 km) north of Luverne. The outcrop of quartzite is contained in Minnesota's Blue Mounds State Park.

Course

Along its course the Rock River passes the towns of Holland, Edgerton, Luverne and Ash Creek in Minnesota; and the towns of Rock Rapids, Doon and Rock Valley in Iowa.

Tributaries
In Iowa, it collects the Little Rock River just south of Doon.

See also
List of Iowa rivers
List of Minnesota rivers
List of longest streams of Minnesota
Rock River (for other Rock Rivers)

References

Columbia Gazetteer of North America entry
DeLorme (1998). Iowa Atlas & Gazetteer. Yarmouth, Maine: DeLorme. .
DeLorme (1994). Minnesota Atlas & Gazetteer. Yarmouth, Maine: DeLorme. .

 Waters, Thomas F. (1977). The Streams and Rivers of Minnesota. Minneapolis: University of Minnesota Press. .

Rivers of Iowa
Rivers of Minnesota
Rivers of Lyon County, Iowa
Rivers of Pipestone County, Minnesota
Rivers of Rock County, Minnesota
Rivers of Sioux County, Iowa
Tributaries of the Mississippi River